is a Japanese anime biographical film directed by Noboru Ishiguro. The film premiered on November 15, 2008. Within Japan it was released via Joueikai and Oyako Eiga. Its tagline was "Don't Give Up on Your Dreams."

The film portrays the career of Yoichi Hatta, a civil engineer active in Japanese Taiwan, and his interactions with the native Taiwanese. It was financed as a commemoration of the 115th anniversary of the Hokkoku Shimbun, a newspaper in Hatta's hometown of Kanazawa, and produced by Mushi Productions. Preview screenings were held on November 11, 2008 at Hokkoku Shimbun's Akabane Hall and on November 20 at Meiji Yasuda Life Hall (MY Shinjuku Building), while the first public screening was held on November 15 at the opening of Kanazawa's Corona Cinema World. Afterwards, it was primarily screened in schools and public institutions in Ishikawa Prefecture and from May 8, 2009 in Cinemate Mini-Theater in Shinjuku. It was also released in Taiwan.

The film's title is derived from Patten lai-a, the Taiwanese term for "Hatta has come,".

Plot 

In the early stages of Japanese colonization in Taiwan, the Chianan Plain in southwestern Taiwan was considered a barren land due to its low rainfall and lack of irrigation. Yoichi Hatta is sent to this area by the colonial government to develop plans for massive irrigation projects. At first the local farmers question Hatta's intentions and harbor feelings of hostility. But among them, a boy named Yingzhe is moved by Hatta's conviction in his project and comes to understand the necessity of a dam and wishes to become a civil engineer as well. Susumu, a boy who lives in a nearby community of Japanese laborers, has a dream of riding in an airplane. Yingzhe and Susumu are kindred spirits and discuss their dreams. But one day, over 50 people die due to a construction explosion, among them Susumu's father. There is talk of halting construction, and Hatta is distressed.

Cast 

Yoichi Hatta: Kazuhiko Inoue
Xu Yingzhe: Junko Minagawa
Susumu Tsuji: Fujiko Takimoto
Miyo Aragaki: Yuko Gibu
Kenkichi Tsuji: Atsushi Gotou
Toyoki Hatta: Tae Hitoto

Release 

Pattenrai!! was released on November 13, 2009 in Taiwan with a mixed Mandarin-Taiwanese dub (with some theaters opting for the original Japanese voices with Chinese subtitles). Preview screenings were held on November 4 in Xinying District, Tainan with President Ma Ying-jeou attending and on November 9 in Taipei with former President Lee Teng-hui and former President of the Executive Yuan Frank Hsieh in attendance. In 2010 it was shown in Tainan schools.

Reception 

Pattenrai! won the 23rd Japan Society of Civil Engineers' Cinema Committee's Most Excellent award.

References

External links 
  (Mushi Productions) 
  (Hokkoku Shimbun) 
 Information on Yoichi Hatta 
 

2008 films
2000s biographical films
2000s historical films
2008 anime films
Films set in 1917
Films set in Taiwan
Japanese biographical films
Japanese historical films
Mushi Production